CCH, formerly Commerce Clearing House, is a provider of software and information services for tax, accounting and audit workers. Since 1995 it has been a subsidiary of Wolters Kluwer.

History 
CCH has been publishing materials on U.S. tax law and tax compliance since the inception of the modern U.S. federal income tax in 1913. Wolters Kluwer bought the company in 1995.

Today, the company is also recognized for its software and integrated workflow tools. CCH operates on a global scale and includes operations in the United States, Europe, Asia-Pacific and Canada.

Case law reporters 
The following is a list of case law reporters published by CCH:
Bankruptcy Law Reporter (Bankr. L. Rep.)
Copyright Law Reporter (Copy. L. Rep.)
Employment Practice Decisions (Empl. Prac. Dec.)
Federal Contracting Cases (Cont. Cas. Fed.)
Federal Securities Law Reporter (Fed. Sec. L. Rep.)
Labor Cases (Lab. Cas.)
Products Liability Reporter (Prod. Liab. Rep.)
Trade Cases (Trade Cas.)
U.S. Tax Cases (U.S. Tax Cas.)
Unemployment Insurance Reporter (Unemployment Ins. Rep.)

References

External links 
CCH website
Wolters Kluwer website

Accounting software
Book publishing companies based in Illinois
Companies based in Lake County, Illinois
Riverwoods, Illinois
Financial software companies
Legal research
Publishing companies established in 1913
1913 establishments in Illinois
Software companies of the United States